Khon Kaen Provincial Administrative Organization Stadium is a multi-purpose stadium in Khon Kaen Province, Thailand. It is currently used mostly for football matches and is the home stadium of Khon Kaen FC and Khon Kaen United.  The stadium holds 7,000 people.

References

Football venues in Thailand
Multi-purpose stadiums in Thailand
Buildings and structures in Khon Kaen province
Sport in Khon Kaen province